Lázaro Martínez may refer to:

Lázaro Martínez (sprinter) (born 1962), Cuban sprinter
Lázaro Martínez (triple jumper) (born 1997), Cuban triple jumper
Lázaro Arias Martínez (born 1957), Mexican PRI politician